The Rise and Fall of Adam and Eve is a non-fiction book by literary historian Stephen Greenblatt, published in 2017. The book delves into the rise and fall of the story of Adam and Eve in Western culture.

External links
"The Rise and Fall of Adam and Eve by Stephen Greenblatt review – how a myth was exposed" by Tim Whitmarsh, The Guardian, 28 September 2017
"The Rise and Fall of Adam and Eve: exploring the myth of the original sinners" by John Gray, New Statesman, 9 September 2017
"The Truth of Fiction of Adam and Eve" by Marilynne Robinson, New York Times Book Review, 7 October 2017

2017 non-fiction books
History books about Christianity
History books about literature
W. W. Norton & Company books
Cultural depictions of Adam and Eve
The Bodley Head books